Merly Zambrano (born December 7, 1981) is an Ecuadorian international footballer who plays as a defender. She played for Ecuador at the 2015 FIFA Women's World Cup.

References

External links
 
 Profile  at FEF
 

1981 births
Living people
Women's association football defenders
Ecuadorian women's footballers
Ecuador women's international footballers
2015 FIFA Women's World Cup players
L.D.U. Quito Femenino players
21st-century Ecuadorian women